Opatha is a surname. Notable people with the surname include:

Rashmika Opatha (born 1997), Sri Lankan cricketer
Tony Opatha (1947–2020), Sri Lankan cricketer

Sinhalese surnames